Aaron Aaronsohn (21 May 1876 – 15 May 1919) was a Jewish agronomist, botanist, and Zionist activist, who was born in Romania and lived most of his life in the Land of Israel, then part of the Ottoman Empire. Aaronsohn was the discoverer of emmer (Triticum dicoccoides), believed to be "the mother of wheat." He founded and was head of the NILI espionage network.

Biography

Aaron Aaronsohn was born in Bacău, Romania, and brought to Palestine, then part of the Turkish Ottoman Empire, at the age of six. His parents were among the founders of Zikhron Ya'akov, one of the pioneer Jewish agricultural settlements of the First Aliyah. He had two sisters, Sarah and Rivka.
Aaronsohn was the first car-owner in Palestine and one of the first to own a bicycle, which he brought back from France. The languages Aaronsohn spoke at home were Yiddish and Hebrew, but he also knew English, Arabic,
Turkish, French, German, and some Italian.

Agriculture and botany
After studying agriculture in France, sponsored by Baron Edmond de Rothschild, Aaronsohn worked in Metulla, then a new colony in the north of the country. He left Metulla to establish an organization for agricultural technology. Together with a member of the German Templer community he launched a business for importing and selling agricultural machines such as reapers, harrows and combine harvesters using modern marketing methods. Another company he established sold gasoline-operated pumps, a centrifuge for separating cream and making butter, and fertilizers. He also imported different varieties of seeds and vines.

He botanically mapped Palestine and its surroundings and became a leading expert on the subject. On his 1906 field trip to Mount Hermon, while trekking around the Upper Galilee in the area of Rashaya in what is now Lebanon, The geographical distribution of wild wheats in their historical setting and current context he discovered Triticum dicoccoides, whom he considered to be the "mother of wheat", an important find for agronomists and historians of human civilization. Geneticists have proven that wild emmer is indeed an ancestor of most domesticated wheat strands cultivated on a large scale today with the exception of einkorn, a different ancient species, which is currently just a relict crop.

This discovery made Aaronsohn world-famous and, on a trip to the United States, he was able to secure financial backing for a research station established in Atlit in 1909. Aaronsohn built up a large collection of geological and botanical samples and established a library.

Aaronsohn served as a scientific consultant to Djemal Pasha during a crop-destroying desert locust invasion in 1915. In March–October of that year, the locusts stripped the country of almost all vegetation. Aaronsohn and the team fighting the locust invasion was given permission to move around the area known as Southern Syria (including modern day Israel) and made detailed maps of the areas they surveyed. Aaronsohn also collected strategic information about Ottoman camps and troop deployment.

In 1918, Aaronsohn was one of the experts consulted for the purpose of demarcating the northern boundary of Palestine, focusing on the need for irrigation water. He envisaged a boundary that would assure the inclusion of the sources of the Jordan, Litani and Yarmuk rivers. His approach became the official Zionist baseline presented to the Peace Conference in Paris in February 1919.

Political activity and espionage
During World War I, the Ottomans had joined sides with the Germans, and Aaronsohn feared the Jews would suffer the same fate as the Armenians under the Turks. Together with his assistant Avshalom Feinberg, his sister Sarah Aaronsohn and a few others, Aaronsohn organized Nili, a ring of Jewish residents of Palestine who spied for Britain during World War I. He recommended the plan of attack through Beersheva that General Edmund Allenby ultimately used to take Jerusalem in December 1917 as part of the Sinai and Palestine Campaign. Owing to information supplied by Nili to the British Army concerning the locations of oases in the desert, General Allenby was able to mount a surprise attack on Beersheba, bypassing strong Ottoman defenses in Gaza.

In 1917, Chaim Weizmann sent Aaronsohn on a political campaign to the USA. While there, Aaronsohn learned that the Ottoman authorities had intercepted a Nili carrier pigeon, which led to the arrest and torture of his sister Sarah and other members of the underground.

Death and legacy
After the war, Weizmann called on Aaronsohn to work on the Versailles Peace Conference. On 15 May 1919, under unclear circumstances, Aaronsohn was killed in an airplane crash over the English Channel while on his way to France. Some blamed the British government.

Aaronsohn died a bachelor and had no children. His research on Palestine and Transjordan flora, as well as part of his exploration diaries, were published posthumously.

After Aaronsohn's death, the director of British Military Intelligence confirmed that Allenby's victory would not have been possible without the information supplied by the Aaronsohn group.

Published works
 Agricultural and botanical explorations in Palestine, 1910
 "Shemot ha-tzemachim" ("Botanical names"), in: Hashelaḥ 26 (1912)
 Reliquiae Aaronsohnianae, 1940

See also
Agricultural research in Israel
Wildlife of Israel

References

Further reading
 Ronald Florence, Lawrence and Aaronsohn: T. E. Lawrence, Aaron Aaronsohn, and the Seeds of the Arab-Israeli Conflict, 2007, Viking Adult, .
 Chaim Herzog, Heroes of Israel, 1989, Little Brown and Company, Boston 
 Goldstone, Patricia. Aaronsohn's Maps: The Untold Story of the Man Who Might Have Created Peace in the Middle East. San Diego: Harcourt, 2007.
 Shmuel Katz, The Aaronsohn Saga, 2007, Gefen Publishing House, Jerusalem 
 Anderson, Scott. Lawerence in Arabia: War, Deceit, Imperial Folly and the Making of the Modern Middle East, 2013, Doubleday, .
Ot me-Avshalom by Nava Macmel-Atir, 2009 (Hebrew), 
 Recent research on the genetic potential of the wild emmer discovered by Aaronsohn. Abstract of "Evolutionary agriculture domestication of wild emmer wheat" by Junhua Peng & Eviatar Nevo. Chapter 8 (pp. 193–255) of New Horizons in Evolution. Academic Press/Elsevier (2021), . Via sciencedirect.com. Accessed 2021-12-18.

External links
 Aaron Aharonson (1876-1919) on the Jewish Agency website

1876 births
1919 deaths
19th-century Romanian Jews
Ashkenazi Jews in Ottoman Palestine
Botanists with author abbreviations
Jewish biologists
Jewish scientists
Romanian botanists
Romanian agronomists
Natural history of Israel
Romanian emigrants to the Ottoman Empire
People from Bacău
People from Zikhron Ya'akov
Victims of aviation accidents or incidents in international waters
World War I spies for the United Kingdom
Natural history of Palestine (region)